Potatoman Seeks the Troof is a humorous and philosophical 2012 Flash platformer developed by American game indie game studio PixelJAM Games. It was included as one of 7 "Digital Select" titles for the IndieCade independent games festival in 2013 and received an honorable mention at the Independent Games Festival 2014 (but no nomination). The protagonist of the game - a potato - solves puzzles while roaming through desert wastelands, thick forests and dystopian cities. An updated version of the game was re-released on Steam in 2014. The game was also released on the iPhone in 2015.

Reception
The game has been described as mechanically bare-bones yet very challenging. The controls were criticized in both the Flash game and the smartphone version.

References

2012 video games
Browser games
Flash games
Indie video games
PixelJAM Games games
Platform games
Single-player video games
Video games about food and drink
Video games developed in the United States